Danish Cyclists' Federation (da: Cyklistforbundet) is a Danish non-governmental bicycle interest organisation, with the purpose of promoting bicycling and bicycle safety. It was founded in 1905 and got around 16,000 members (2013) Danish Cyclists' Federation is a member organisation of the European Cyclists' Federation, ECF and of the Cycling Embassy of Denmark.

With a view to remedying the situation of bicycle parking in Copenhagen and other Danish cities, in 2008 the Danish Cyclists' Federation  published a "Bicycling Parking Manual" with a number of guidelines, that is now published in English by the Cycling Embassy of Danmark.

See also
 Federation of Danish Motorists
 Outline of cycling

References

External links 
 Dansk Cyklist Forbund (official homepage of Danish Cyclists' Federation)
 Cycling Embassy of Danmark 
 Short Summary about members at European Cyclists' Federation
 Jakob Schiøtt Stenbæk Madsen: Bicycle Parking Manual 

Cycling in Denmark
Cycling organizations
Transport organizations based in Denmark
1905 establishments in Denmark
Sports organizations established in 1905